Barnaby is a Canadian community in Northumberland County, New Brunswick. It is located south of the city of Miramichi.

History

Notable people

See also
List of communities in New Brunswick

References

Border Communities
 Acadie Siding
 Pleasant Ridge
 Collette

Communities in Northumberland County, New Brunswick